FK Begej is a Serbian football club based in Žitište, Serbia.
{

Begej Zitiste
Begej Zitiste